Winnemucca Municipal Airport  is six miles southwest of Winnemucca, in Humboldt County, Nevada. The airport was renamed Franklin Field on April 20, 2019, in honor of Lt. Col. Irl “Leon” Franklin, a decorated Vietnam War veteran and combat pilot who earned the Silver Star for his lead role in Operation Ivory Coast.

The National Plan of Integrated Airport Systems for 2011–2015 categorized it as a general aviation facility.

Facilities
The airport covers 968 acres (392 ha) at an elevation of 4,308 feet (1,313 m). It has two asphalt runways: 14/32 is 7,000 by 100 feet (2,134 x 30 m) and 2/20 is 4,800 by 75 feet (1,463 x 23 m). It has two concrete helipads (H1 and H2) each 25 by 25 feet (8 x 8 m).

In the year ending June 30, 2012 the airport had 25,575 aircraft operations, average 70 per day: 94% general aviation, 6% air taxi, and <1% military. 34 aircraft were then based at this airport: 94% single-engine and 6% multi-engine.

See also 
 List of airports in Nevada

References

External links 
 
  from Nevada DOT
 Aerial image as of June 1994 from USGS The National Map
 

Airports in Nevada
Buildings and structures in Humboldt County, Nevada
Transportation in Humboldt County, Nevada
Winnemucca, Nevada